The Authors' Club is a British membership organisation established as a place where writers could meet and talk. It was founded by the novelist and critic Walter Besant in 1891. It is headquartered at the National Liberal Club.

The Authors' Club was based for many years next door to its present site, on Whitehall Court, first moving into the National Liberal Club in 1966. After ten years there, in 1976 the Authors' Club joined forces with The Arts Club in Dover Street, London W1. In 2011 it moved to Blacks, a Grade 2* listed building by John Meard in Dean Street, Soho — a house that was once home to a club run by Samuel Johnson and Thomas Gainsborough — where it remained for three years. It has now returned to its old home in the National Liberal Club. The Club welcomes both men and women as members, and is open to all those "professionally engaged with literature".

It was at a dinner at the Authors’ Club that Oscar Wilde denounced the censorship of his play Salome. "Casting aside all his gifts of humour and irony the angry Irish poet poured out his sense of assault and battery committed upon himself and laid his spirit bare and bruised before us. Having finished he did not sit down again but swept from the company still overwhelmed by the weight of his wrongs."

Three Poets Laureate — Alfred Austin, John Masefield and John Betjeman — have graced its ranks, while guest speakers included Émile Zola, Mark Twain, Rudyard Kipling, Frances Hodgson Burnett, Winston Churchill, Bram Stoker, TS Eliot and Clement Attlee. Arthur Conan Doyle was for many years chairman, and often used to read his manuscripts to members prior to publication.

The first president of the Authors' Club was the novelist  George Meredith; he was followed by Thomas Hardy; who was in turn succeeded  by J. M. Barrie. Subsequent presidents included the architectural historian Sir Banister Fletcher, the Anglo-Irish writer, dramatist and poet Lord Dunsany, Compton Mackenzie — author of Whisky Galore — and Laurence Meynell. The current president is the author and The Independent columnist John Walsh.

Awards 
The Club holds literary lunches and dinners. It hosts three literary awards each year: the Authors' Club First Novel Award, the  Dolman Best Travel Book Award, and the Banister Fletcher Award for the best book on art or architecture.

Notable members

Past members 
 Arnold Bennett
 Kate Louise Brown
 Ford Madox Ford
 C. S. Forester
 Graham Greene
 Archibald Grimke
 H. Rider Haggard
 E. W. Hornung
 Michael Jacobs
 Jerome K. Jerome
 Malcolm Muggeridge
 Barry Pain
 Kim Philby
 Anthony Powell
 Ameen Rihani
 Ernest Shackleton
 W. W. Skeat
 G. M. Trevelyan
 H. G. Wells
 Thornton Wilder
 Harold Wilson
 Francis Younghusband
 Israel Zangwill
 Frank R. Stockton

Present members 
 Amanda Craig
 William Dalrymple
 Rachel Lichtenstein
 Deborah Moggach
 Nicola Monaghan
 Andrew O'Hagan
 Vikram Seth
 Miranda Seymour
 Sunny Singh

References

External links
 Official website

1891 establishments in the United Kingdom
Arts organizations established in 1891
British artist groups and collectives
British writers' organisations
Gentlemen's clubs in London
Soho, London